Cécile Louise Stéphanie Chaminade (8 August 1857 – 13 April 1944) was a French composer and pianist. In 1913, she was awarded the Légion d'Honneur, a first for a female composer. Ambroise Thomas said, "This is not a woman who composes, but a composer who is a woman."

Biography
Born in Paris, Chaminade was raised in a musical family. She received her first piano lessons from her mother. Around age 10, Chaminade was assessed by Félix Le Couppey of the Conservatoire de Paris, who recommended that she study music at the Conservatoire. Her father forbade it because he believed it was improper for a girl of Chaminade's class. Her father did, however, allow Chaminade to study privately with teachers from the Conservatoire: piano with Le Couppey, violin with Marie Gabriel Augustin Savard and Martin Pierre Marsick, and music composition with Benjamin Godard.

Chaminade experimented in composition as a young child, composing pieces for her cats, dogs and dolls. In 1869, she performed some of her music for Georges Bizet, who was impressed with her talents. In 1878, Chaminade gave a salon performance under the auspices of her professor, Le Couppey, consisting entirely of her compositions. This performance marked the beginning of her emergence as a composer and became the archetype for the concerts she gave for the rest of her career in which she only performed her own works. Her Concertino, Op. 107, is an important work in the flute repertoire.

She toured France several times in her early years. In 1892, she debuted in England, where her work was popular. Isidor Philipp, head of the piano department at the Conservatoire de Paris, championed her works. She repeatedly returned to England in the 1890s, premiering her compositions with such singers as Blanche Marchesi; and Pol Plançon; this activity decreased after 1899 due to poor reviews.

Chaminade married a music publisher from Marseille, Louis-Mathieu Carbonel, in 1901. Due to his advanced age, this was rumored to be a convenience and Chaminade prescribed strict marriage conditions - they were to live separately, Carbonel in Marseille, and she near Paris, and their marriage was to remain platonic. Carbonel died in 1907 from a lung disease. Chaminade never remarried.

In 1908, she performed concerts in twelve cities in the United States. Her compositions were tremendous favorites with the American public, and such pieces as the Scarf Dance or the Ballet No. 1 were to be found in the music libraries of many lovers of piano music of the time. She composed a Konzertstück for piano and orchestra, the ballet music to Callirhoé and other orchestral works. Her songs, such as The Silver Ring and Ritournelle, were also great favorites. Ambroise Thomas once said of Chaminade: "This is not a woman who composes, but a composer who is a woman." In 1913, she was elected a Chevalier of the National Order of the Legion of Honour (French: Ordre national de la Légion d'honneur), a first for a female composer. In London in November 1901, she made gramophone recordings of seven of her compositions for the Gramophone and Typewriter Company; these are among the most sought-after piano recordings by collectors, though they have been reissued on compact disk. Before and after World War I, Chaminade recorded many piano rolls, but as she grew older, she composed less and less, dying in Monte Carlo on 13 April 1944, where she was first buried. Chaminade is now buried in Passy Cemetery in Paris.

Chaminade was relegated to obscurity for the second half of the 20th century, her piano pieces and songs mostly forgotten, with the exception being the Flute Concertino in D major, Op. 107, composed for the 1902 Paris Conservatoire Concours; it is her most popular piece today.

Chaminade's sister married Moritz Moszkowski, also a well-known composer and pianist like Cécile.

Critical reception
Many of Chaminade's piano compositions received good reviews from critics, but some of her other endeavors and more serious works were less favourably evaluated, perhaps on account of gender prejudices. Most of her compositions were published during her lifetime and were financially successful.

Compositional style
Chaminade affiliated herself with nationalist composers such as Camille Saint-Saëns and Charles Gounod. Her musical style was rooted in both Romantic and French tradition throughout her career and her music has been described as tuneful, highly accessible and mildly chromatic. In describing her own style, Chaminade wrote, "I am essentially of the Romantic school, as all my work shows."

Important works

Opera 
Op. 19 La Sévillane, comic opera (1882)

Orchestral 
Op. 20 Suite d'Orchestre (1881)
Op. 26 Symphonie Dramatique Les Amazones" (1884)
Op. 37 Callirhoë, ballet symphonique (1888)
Op. 40 Konzertstück in C-sharp minor for piano and orchestra (1888)
Op. 107 Concertino for flute and orchestra in D major (1902)

Piano 
Op. 21 Piano Sonata in C minor (1893)
Op. 35 Six Études de Concert (Enoch) (1886)
Op. 54 Lolita. Caprice espagnol (Enoch) 1890
Op. 89 Thème varié (1898)
Op. 120 Variations sur un thème original (1906)
Op. 117 Duo Symphonique for 2 pianos (1905)
Op. 123 Album des enfants, première série (1906)
Op. 126 Album des enfants, deuxième série (1907)

Piano Duets 
Op. 55  Six Pièces Romantiques, Op. 55 (1890)

Two Pianos Four Hands 

Op. 19 La Sevillane 
Op. 36 Deux Pièces for 2 Pianos, 
Op. 59 Andante et Scherzettino
Op. 73 Valse Carnavalesque(1894)
Op.117 Duo Symphonique 
WU 19 Marche Hongroise (1880),unpublished

Chamber music 
Op. 11 Piano Trio No. 1 in G minor (1880)
Op. 34 Piano Trio No. 2 in A minor (1886)
Op. 142 Sérénade aux étoiles for Flute and Piano (1911?)

Songs 

"Chanson slave" (1890)
"Les rêves" (1891)
"Te souviens-tu?" (1878)
"Auprès de ma mie" (1888)
"Voisinage" (1888)
"Nice la belle" (1889)
"Rosemonde" (1878)
"L'anneau d'argent" (1891)
"Plaintes d'amour" (1891)
"Viens, mon bien-aimé" (1892)
"L'Amour captif" (1893)
"Ma première lettre" (1893)
"Malgré nous" (1893)
"Si j'étais jardinier" (1893)
"L'Été" (1894)
"Mignonne" (1894)
"Sombrero" (1894)
"Villanelle" (1894)
"Espoir" (1895)
"Ronde d'amour" (1895)
"Chanson triste" (1898)
"Mots d'amour" (1898)
"Alléluia" (1901)
"Écrin" (1902)
"Bonne humeur!" (1903)
"Menuet" (1904)
"La lune paresseuse" (1905)
"Je voudrais" (1912)
"Attente (Au pays de provence)" (1914)

References

External links

 Free digital scores by Cécile Chaminade in the OpenScore Lieder Corpus
Piano Rolls (The Reproducing Piano Roll Foundation)

Stanford University Piano Roll Archive SUPRA 

1857 births
1944 deaths
19th-century classical composers
19th-century French women classical pianists
19th-century French composers
20th-century classical composers
20th-century French composers
20th-century French women musicians
Conservatoire de Paris alumni
French women classical composers
French Romantic composers
Musicians from Paris
20th-century women composers
19th-century women composers
20th-century women pianists